ACCIONA Energía, a subsidiary of Acciona. Is a company dedicated to providing solutions based on renewable energy, with the goal of contributing to the decarbonization of the planet.

Based in Madrid, ACCIONA Energía is involved in the energy industry's entire value chain: the development and structuring of projects, engineering, construction, supply, operations, maintenance, asset management and management and sales of clean energy.

History 
ACCIONA Energía has its start more than 30 years ago in the renewable energy industry. Important milestones in its history include the installation in December 1994 of the first commercial wind farm in Spain on the Sierra del Perdón, next to Pamplona, Navarra, by the Energía Hidroeléctrica de Navarra, S.A. company, acquired by ACCIONA in 2003 and 2004, and the KW Tarifa wind farm by the Alabe company, a subsidiary of ACCIONA, in 1995.  

In 2009, it acquired more than two GW (gigawatts) of renewable assets as part of the operation agreed with the Enel electric group where ACCIONA stopped participating in Endesa.  

Since July 1, 2021, ACCIONA Energía has been listed on the Madrid, Barcelona, Bilbao and Valencia Stock Exchanges, under the ANE ticker, with ACCIONA, S.A. as the primary shareholder as of December 31, 2021.

Business lines 
ACCIONA Energía (with the business name of Corporación Acciona Energías Renovables, S.A.) counts with renewable energy assets in five technologies (wind power, solar energy, hydroelectricity, biomass and solar thermal energy) which, as of December 31, 2021, added up to 11.2 gigawatts (GW) of installed capacity. This capacity is distributed between 16 countries in all five continents and in 2021 it produced a total of 24.5 terawatt-hours (TWh) of 100% renewable energy, equivalent to the electric consumption of 7.6 million homes. The company has announced its goals of reaching a total installed capacity of 20 GW by 2025 and of 30 GW by 2030, with new installations primarily for wind power and solar energy.

Besides generating and selling renewable energy, ACCIONA Energía also works in the following industries: energy for self-consumption, energy efficiency services, installation and operation of infrastructure for charging electric vehicles, and green hydrogen industries, focused primarily on corporate and institutional clients.

In 2021, it invested more than 91 million euros in innovation projects. This activity was primarily focused on green hydrogen, offshore wind power, innovative photovoltaic systems, smart bidirectional chargers for electric vehicles, circular economy, life extension of renewable assets, advanced O&M technologies and energy storage, among others.

International presence 
ACCIONA Energía counts with an active presence in 20 countries throughout the five continents. The primary geographic areas where it operates, besides Spain, are North America (the United States and Canada), Latin America (Mexico, Chile, Brazil, Peru, Costa Rica, and the Dominican Republic) and Australia. It is also present in Africa, with projects in Egypt and South Africa, as well as in other European countries (Portugal, France, Italy, Poland, Croatia, Ukraine and Hungary).

Sustainability 
Since 2015, ACCIONA Energía has been topping Energy Intelligence's Top 100 Green Utilities list, which ranks the top 100 power companies in the world based on their carbon emissions and their renewable assets.

Likewise, in 2021, S&P Global Ratings granted it a score of 86 out of 100 in environmental, social, and corporate governance matters, which was the best score in the energy industry worldwide and the fifth best score among all industries.

The company reports that 100% of its capital expenditure is aligned with the European taxonomy of sustainable activities.

See also

 Acciona

References

External links
  Official ACCIONA Energía company website — global  operations.
  ACCIONA Energía North America company website
 Renewableenergyaccess.com: "Acciona's First Wind Turbine Plant in the U.S. Under Way" (2007)
 Businesswire.com: "Acciona Acquires 1300 MW of Development Assets in Midwest U.S." (2007)

Energy companies of Spain
Renewable energy companies of Europe
Engine manufacturers
Solar energy companies
Wind power companies
Wind turbine manufacturers
Wind power companies of the United States
Energy companies established in 2007
Renewable resource companies established in 2007
Manufacturing companies based in Iowa
Stephenson County, Illinois
Spanish brands
Kohlberg Kravis Roberts companies
Spanish companies established in 2007